This is a list of friendly, mutual and benevolent societies.

 AARP
 Ancient Order of Foresters 
 Askrigg Friendly Society
 Australian Natives' Association
 Benenden Healthcare Society (UK)
 Benevolent Irish Society (Canada)
 Benevolent Society (Australia)
 Catholic Mutual Benevolent Association 
 Druids Sheffield Friendly Society
 Exeter Friendly Society
 Independent Order of Foresters
 Grand United Order of Odd Fellows
 Independent Order of Good Templars
 Independent Order of Odd Fellows
 Independent Order of Rechabites
 Kingston Unity Friendly Society
 Knights of Columbus
 Knights of the Maccabees
 National Friendly
 Order of Free Gardeners
 Polish Roman Catholic Union of America
 Red Rose Friendly Society
 Royal Liver Assurance
 Scottish Friendly
 Sheffield Mutual Friendly Society
 Shepherds Friendly Society
 Sons of England Benevolent Society (Canada)
 Sons of Temperance
 Teachers Assurance
 Langport & district friendly society

References

Friendly societies
Mutualism (movement)